The Iguanodontia (the iguanodonts) are a clade of herbivorous dinosaurs that lived from the Middle Jurassic to Late Cretaceous. Some members include Camptosaurus, Dryosaurus, Iguanodon, Tenontosaurus, and the hadrosaurids or "duck-billed dinosaurs". Iguanodontians were one of the first groups of dinosaurs to be found. They are among the best known of the dinosaurs, and were among the most diverse and widespread herbivorous dinosaur groups of the Cretaceous period.

Classification

Iguanodontia is often listed as an infraorder within a suborder Ornithopoda, though Benton (2004) lists Ornithopoda as an infraorder and does not rank Iguanodontia. Traditionally, iguanodontians were grouped into the superfamily Iguanodontoidea and family Iguanodontidae. However, phylogenetic studies show that the traditional "iguanodontids" are a paraphyletic grade leading up to the hadrosaurs (duck-billed dinosaurs). Groups like Iguanodontoidea are sometimes still used as unranked clades in the scientific literature, though many traditional "iguanodontids" are now included in the more inclusive group Hadrosauroidea.

Iguanodontia was originally phylogenetically defined, by Paul Sereno, in 1998, as the most inclusive group containing Parasaurolophus walkeri but not Hypsilophodon foxii. Later, in 2005, he amended the definition to include Thescelosaurus neglectus as a secondary external specifier, alongside Hypsilophodon, accounting for the paraphyletic nature of Hypsilophodontidae. A 2017 study which named and described Burianosaurus noted that the type species Iguanodon bernissartensis must be part of the definition, and that the 2005 definition would, in their analysis, include a far larger group than intended (including Marginocephalia). They proposed an entirely new, node-based definition: the last common ancestor of Iguanodon bernissartensis, Dryosaurus altus, Rhabdodon priscus, and Tenontosaurus tilletti. In 2021, Iguanodontia was given a formal definition under the PhyloCode: "The smallest clade containing Dryosaurus altus, Iguanodon bernissartensis, Rhabdodon priscus, and Tenontosaurus tilletti, provided that it does not include Hypsilophodon foxii." Under this revised definition, Iguanodontia is limited to its traditionally included species, and if it were found to include hypsilophodonts, which were not traditionally considered iguanodontians, it would become an invalid grouping.

The cladogram below follows an analysis by Madzia et al. (2017):

References

External links
 

 
Callovian first appearances
Maastrichtian extinctions
Taxa named by Georg Baur